The 2012 Autumn International Series is a rugby league tri-series between England, France and Wales.

Teams

France vs Wales

Wales vs England

England vs France

Final

References

International Series, 2012
International rugby league competitions hosted by the United Kingdom
2012 in English rugby league
2012 in Welsh rugby league
International rugby league competitions hosted by France